Atlee or Attlee may refer to:
 Clement Attlee, UK Prime Minister (1945 to 1951)
 Atlee (name) or Attlee, a given name and surname
 Atlee (director), Indian film director
 Earl Attlee, a title in the peerage of the United Kingdom
 Atlee (comics), a DC Comics character
 Attlee Glacier, Antarctica
 Atlee, Alberta, Canada, a locality
 Atlee, Virginia, United States, an unincorporated community
 Atlee High School